Three Fires may refer to:

 Three fires (Buddhism), the three primary causes of unskillful action in Buddhism

See also
 Council of Three Fires, a long-standing Anishinaabe alliance of the Ojibwe, Ottawa, and Potawatomi North American Native tribes
 Three Fires Council, Boy Scouts of America, St. Charles Illinois
 Three Fires District, part of the Southern Shores Field Service Council of the Boy Scouts of America
 Two Fires
 Four Fires
 Seven fires